Artem Pavlovich Metelev (born 11 August 1993, Moscow, Russia) is a Russian political figure and a chairman of the State Duma committee on youth policy, deputy of the 8th State Duma from 2021.

From 2017 – Chairman of the Council of the Association of Volunteer Centers.

Biography 
From 2009 to 2012, Metelev worked as the chairman of the Youth Public Chamber of the Silino District (Moscow) and as a curator of the Youth Parliament project in Zelenograd.

In 2010–2013, Metelev was the deputy head of the district branch of the Young Guard of United Russia in the Zelenograd administrative district of Moscow.

In 2014-2016 was the leading specialist of the Federal State Budgetary Institution «Rospatriotcenter».

In 2016-2017 he co-chaired the Association of Volunteer Centers.

Since 2017 – Chairman of the Council of the Association of Volunteer Centers.

In 2017, he was a member of the Organizing and National Preparatory Committees of the XIX World Festival of Youth and Students, In 2018 — deputy head of the directorate for the Year of the Volunteer in the Russian Federation.

From 2017 to 2021 he became a member of the Civic Chamber of the Russian Federation, deputy chairman of the Commission for Youth Development, Volunteering,  Patriotic Education Civic Chamber of the Russian Federation.

In the summer of 2020, Metelev proposed to initiate an international advertising campaign on behalf of the United Nations dedicated to the importance and role of volunteerism.

In 2020, he became a co-organizer of the all-Russian action of mutual assistance, aimed at supporting elderly, disabled citizens and medical staff during the coronavirus pandemic.

Since September 2021, he has served as deputy of the 8th State Duma.

Metelev is the leader of the volunteer movement in Russia. The creator of the project about social comfort.

Legislative activity 
On October 7, 2021, he was nominated for the position of chairman of the committee State Duma on youth policy.

On October 12, 2021, he was elected Chairman of the State Duma Committee on Youth Policy.

Since 2021, during the term of office of the State Duma deputy of the VIII convocation, he has authored and co-authored 18 legislative initiatives and amendments to draft federal laws. Including:

Became the initiator of the bill on compensation payments to volunteers injured in the course of their activities.

Became one of the authors of the law "On the Russian Movement of children and youth".

Became the initiator of the bill on the abolition of personal income tax for financial assistance to students of colleges and universities.

Became the initiator of the bill on simplification of the mechanism of employment of minors.

Became one of the authors of the initiative on preferential visits to cultural institutions for volunteers and volunteers.

Became one of the authors of the initiative to compensate the costs of communication services to volunteers.

He became one of the authors of an initiative that allows orphans to register at the address of the local administration before receiving their own housing

Became a co-author of the initiative on the transfer of confiscated goods to charity.

In 2023, he launched the Youth Rights Protection Center under the State Duma Committee on Youth Policy. The human rights organization will become a single window for young people who need legal support.

In January 2023, he announced that State University of Management will become the main university of the State Duma Committee on youth policy on the topic of "youth self-government". In the plan, the development of a law on student self-government, initiatives to improve the effectiveness of youth parliaments, youth public chambers and public associations.

In 2023, he sent to the Government of Russia draft law on fixing in collective agreements of companies with employees measures to support corporate volunteering with the possibility of providing a paid day to participate in social projects. An amendment is planned to the Labor Code of Russia.

Hobbies 
He was engaged in professional sports (judo, sport swimming, rugby).

Awards  
 Decoration "For Beneficence".
 Gratitude of the President of the Russian Federation — "for active participation in the socio-political life of Russian society."
 Commemorative medal and diploma of the President of the Russian Federation — "for selfless contribution to the organization of the All-Russian action of mutual assistance #MYVMESTE".
 Commemorative medal of the President of the Russian Federation "XIX World Festival of Youth and Students 2017 in Sochi".
 Honorary badge of the Federal Agency for Youth Affairs — "for merits in the field of state youth policy".
 Winner of the All-Russian competition "Leaders of Russia. Politics".
 Letter of thanks from the Mayor of Moscow — "for active public activity and a great personal contribution to the development of volunteerism in Moscow."

References

1993 births
Living people
21st-century Russian politicians
Eighth convocation members of the State Duma (Russian Federation)